Capitalization of Internet (versus internet) refers to the orthographic conventions for when the word should be capitalized. When referring to the global system of interconnected computer networks, the conventions have varied over time, and vary by publishers, authors, and regional preferences.

The Internet versus generic internets
The Internet standards community historically differentiated between an internet, as a short-form of an internetwork, and the Internet: treating the latter as a proper noun with a capital letter, and the former as a common noun with a lower-case first letter. An internet is any set of interconnected Internet Protocol (IP) networks. The distinction is evident in Request for Comments documents from the early 1980s, when the transition from the ARPANET, funded by the U.S. Department of Defense, to the Internet, with broad commercial support, was in progress, although it was not applied with complete uniformity.

Another example from that period is IBM's TCP/IP Tutorial and Technical Overview from 1989 (updated in 1998), which stated that:

In the Request for Comments documents that define the evolving Internet Protocol standards, the term was introduced as a noun adjunct, apparently a shortening of "internetworking" and is mostly used in this way.

As the impetus behind IP grew, it became more common to regard the results of internetworking as entities of their own, and internet became a noun, used both in a generic sense (any collection of computer networks connected through internetworking) and in a specific sense (the collection of computer networks that internetworked with ARPANET, and later NSFNET, using the IP standards, and that grew into the connectivity service we know today).

In its generic sense, "internet" is a common noun, a synonym for internetwork; therefore, it has a plural form (first appearing in the RFC series RFC 870, RFC 871 and RFC 872) and is not capitalized.

In a 1991 court case, Judge Jon O. Newman used it as a mass noun: "Morris released the worm into INTERNET, which is a group of national networks that connect university, governmental, and military computers around the country."

Evolution of the word
Conventions for the capitalization of Internet have varied over time. The term Internet was originally coined as a shorthand for internetwork in the first specification of the Transmission Control Program, by Vint Cerf, Yogen Dalal, and Carl Sunshine in 1974. Because of the widespread deployment of the Internet protocol suite in the 1980s by educational and commercial networks beyond the ARPANET, the core network became increasingly known as the Internet, treated as a proper noun. The Oxford English Dictionary says that the global network is usually "the internet", but most of the American historical sources it cites use the capitalized form.

The spelling internet has become often used, as the word almost always refers to the global network; the generic sense of the word has become rare in non-technical writings. As a result, various style manuals, including The Chicago Manual of Style, the Associated Press's AP Stylebook, and the AMA Manual of Style, revised their formerly capitalized stylization of the word to lowercase internet in 2016. The New York Times, which followed suit in adopting the lowercase style, said that such a change is common practice when "newly coined or unfamiliar terms" become part of the lexicon. The same trend has also applied  to mentions of the Web (the World Wide Web) as the web, despite some styling holdouts.

In 2002, a New York Times column said that Internet has been changing from a proper noun to a generic term. Words for new technologies, such as phonograph in the 19th century, are sometimes capitalized at first, later becoming uncapitalized. In 1999, another column said that Internet might, like some other commonly used proper nouns, lose its capital letter.

Capitalization of the word as an adjective (specifically, a noun adjunct) also varies. Some guides specify that the word should be capitalized as a noun but not capitalized as an adjective, e.g., "internet resources."

Usage
Increasingly, organizations that formerly capitalized Internet have switched to the lowercase form, whether to minimize distraction (The New York Times) or to reflect growing trends as the term became generic (Associated Press Stylebook). According to Oxford Dictionaries Online, in 2016 Internet remained more usual in the US, while internet had become predominant in the UK.

Organizations and style guides that capitalize Internet include the Modern Language Association, Garner's Modern English Usage, the Internet Engineering Task Force, CloudFlare, Ars Technica, and the Internet Society. Organizations and style guides that use lowercase internet include Apple, Microsoft, Google, Wired News (since 2004), the United States Government Publishing Office, the Associated Press (since 2016), The New York Times (since 2016), The Chicago Manual of Style (since 2017), APA style (since 2019), The Guardian, The Observer,  BuzzFeed and Vox Media.

References

External links

 Internet, Web, and Other Post-Watergate Concerns, The Chicago Manual of Style

Internet terminology
Capitalization
English usage controversies